The Surma River is a major river in Bangladesh, part of the Surma-Meghna River System. It starts when the Barak River from northeast India divides at the Bangladesh border into the Surma and the Kushiyara rivers. It ends in Kishoreganj District, above Bhairab Bāzār, where the two rivers rejoin to form the Meghna River. The waters from the river ultimately flow into the Bay of Bengal.

Course
From its source in the Manipur Hills near Mao Songsang, the river is known as the Barak River.
At the border with Bangladesh, the river divides with the northern branch being called the Surma River and the southern the Kushiyara River.  This is where the river enters the Sylhet Depression (or trough) which forms the Surma Basin.

The Surma is fed by tributaries from the Meghalaya Hills to the north, and is also known as the Baulai River after it is joined by the south-flowing Someshwari River.

The Kushiyara receives tributaries from the Sylhet Hills and Tripura Hills to the south, the principal one from the Tripura Hills being the Manu. The Kushiyara is also known as the Kalni River after it is joined by a major offshoot (distributary) from the Surma. When the Surma and the Kushiyara finally rejoin in Kishoreganj District above Bhairab Bazar, the river is known as the Meghna River.

The Surma passes through many haors.

Gallery

References

External links
 

Rivers of Bangladesh
Bay of Bengal
Kishoreganj District
Distributaries of the Ganges
Rivers of Dhaka Division